Barakovo may refer to:
Barakovo, Bulgaria
Barakovo, Demir Hisar, North Macedonia
Barakovo, Russia (disambiguation), several towns in Russia